Plaster is  a building material used for coating walls and ceilings.

Plaster may also refer to:
Adhesive bandage or sticking plaster, a medical dressing for small wounds
Poultice, a soft moist mass applied to the body
Plaster (band), a Canadian electro-jazz/electro-rock band

People with the surname Plaster
John Plaster (born 1949), American soldier
George Plaster (born 1959), American broadcaster

See also

Occupational surnames